Klub Piłki Ręcznej Jelenia Góra (formerly Vitaral Jelfa Jelenia Góra) is a Polish women's handball team, based in Jelenia Góra.

See also 
 Handball in Poland
 Sports in Poland
 Always fresh news about Klub Piłki Ręcznej Jelenia Góra, statistics, photo gallery

Polish handball clubs
Jelenia Góra
Sport in Lower Silesian Voivodeship